Gary Mackay (born 23 January 1964 in Edinburgh) is a Scottish former footballer, who made over 500 league appearances for Heart of Midlothian and also played for Airdrieonians and the Scotland national team. After retiring as a player, he managed Airdrie for a year. Mackay is now an SFA–registered agent.

Career

Mackay played for Heart of Midlothian for most of his career, and he holds the record for the most competitive appearances for the club, with 640. Mackay won international recognition in the late 1980s, winning four caps for Scotland. His most significant act as a Scotland player was to score the winning goal in a UEFA Euro 1988 qualifying match against Bulgaria in Sofia. Although this goal did not substantially benefit Scotland, who had already been eliminated, it was of great significance to Ireland, who qualified for the finals as a result of this strike.

Kevin Harper alleged that he had been racially abused by Mackay during a match in November 1996. The Scottish Football Association failed to investigate the incident. Mackay has since been involved in work for 'Show Racism the Red Card' which primarily aims to prevent racism in football.

Mackay left Hearts in 1997 to play for Airdrie. After retiring as a player in 1999, Mackay then managed Airdrie for a season, but the club suffered severe financial problems and he was sacked to make way for Steve Archibald during July 2000.

Mackay has since worked as an agent, representing players including Garry O'Connor, Christophe Berra and Lee Wallace. Mackay was criticised by his former club Hearts in June 2011 on the official Hearts website. "Over a short space of time 4 players at our club have been on the wrong end of the law. We note that 3 of them are represented by the same agent – Gary Mackay – who has been so vicious in his attacks against Mr Romanov".

See also
 List of footballers in Scotland by number of league appearances (500+)

References

External links

London Hearts club profile 
London Hearts international profile

1964 births
Airdrieonians F.C. (1878) managers
Airdrieonians F.C. (1878) players
Heart of Midlothian F.C. players
Living people
Footballers from Edinburgh
Scotland international footballers
Scottish Football League players
Scottish football managers
Scottish footballers
British sports agents
Scottish Football League managers
Association football midfielders